Woman to Woman is the thirteenth studio album by American country music singer-songwriter Tammy Wynette. It was released on November 25, 1974, by Epic Records.

Commercial performance 
The album peaked at No. 21 on the Billboard Country Albums chart. The album's only single, "Woman to Woman", peaked at No. 4 on the Billboard Country Singles chart.

Track listing

Personnel
Adapted from the album liner notes.
Bill Barnes - cover design, photography
Lou Bradley - engineer
Julie Holiner - design
Bill McElhiney - string arrangements
Billy Sherrill - producer
Bergen White - string arrangements
Tammy Wynette - lead vocals

Chart positions

Album

Singles

References

1974 albums
Tammy Wynette albums
Epic Records albums
Albums produced by Billy Sherrill